Glen Riddle is an unincorporated community in Middletown Township in Delaware County, Pennsylvania, United States. Glen Riddle is located at the intersection of Pennsylvania Route 452 and Parkmount Road/Glen Riddle Road north of the Chester Creek.

SEPTA had provided service to Glen Riddle at South Pennell Road (PA-452). The train station was closed in 1986 with closure of the  West Chester Line beyond the Elwyn station. However, SEPTA has been performing ongoing work to restore this area of the track in order to provide service to Wawa, Pennsylvania.

Notable Persons
 I. King Jordan
 Samuel Riddle
 Samuel Doyle Riddle

References

Unincorporated communities in Delaware County, Pennsylvania
Unincorporated communities in Pennsylvania